The 11th Cavalry Division (11-ya Kavaleriiskaya Diviziya) was a cavalry formation of the Russian Imperial Army.

Organization
1st Cavalry Brigade
11th Regiment of Dragoons
11th Uhlan Regiment
2nd Cavalry Brigade
11th Regiment of Hussars
11th Horse Artillery Division
11th Regiment of Cossacks

Chief of Staff
1887-1891: Nikolai Ruzsky
September 16-November 25, 1899: Vladislav Klembovsky

References

Cavalry divisions of the Russian Empire
Military units and formations disestablished in 1918